Pielinen Karelia  is a subdivision of North Karelia and one of the Sub-regions of Finland since 2009.

Municipalities
 Lieksa
 Nurmes

Politics
Results of the 2018 Finnish presidential election:

 Sauli Niinistö   60.7%
 Paavo Väyrynen   9.1%
 Laura Huhtasaari   8.3%
 Pekka Haavisto   6.6%
 Matti Vanhanen   6.6%
 Tuula Haatainen   4.8%
 Merja Kyllönen   3.7%
 Nils Torvalds   0.3%

Sub-regions of Finland
Geography of North Karelia